Amarakeerthi Athukorala (23 December 1964 – 9 May 2022) was a Sri Lankan politician and a member of the Podujana Peramuna in the Sri Lankan parliament from Polonnaruwa Electoral District.

During the 2022 Sri Lankan protests after armed loyalists of former Prime Minister Mahinda Rajapaksa launched a violent attack against peaceful protestors violence erupted against government politicians. In the town of Nittambuwa, Athukorala's vehicle confronted a mob during which Athukorala's body guard opened fire, killing a man and wounding another. He later escaped along with his bodyguard and sought refuge in a nearby building, where they were later found dead.

Notes

References

1964 births
2022 deaths
Sri Lanka Podujana Peramuna politicians
Members of the 16th Parliament of Sri Lanka
People from North Central Province, Sri Lanka